Athirampatty is a place in Mallikuttai village of the Salem district of Tamil Nadu, India. It is located near Tharamangalam, a town known for Kailasanathar Temple and Mettur, a town known for Stanley reservoir and lot of industries .

Athirampatty is situated on midlands, are surrounded by agricultural fields. The main resource for Athirampatty is Silk Sarees manufacturing and agriculture.

The population of the village is approximately 1,500. It is a panchayat in the Tharamagalam Union.

The origin of the Village's name is from elder people "Athiyur". The silk sarees manufactured in Athirampatty is marketed all over Southern India. Many Variety of Silk sarees manufactured in India. The popular one is Pure Gold Jari sarees. This is produced with colored pure raw silks embedded with different symbol designs called "Putta's".

Here the weavers produce white sarees which will be design printed later. This kind of sarees are marketed to Northern Indian states like Gujarat, Rajasthan. There is also empossed sarees which will be producing using Power Loom machines.

All the population are from Vanniyar community, which is most powerful community in Tamil Nadu. There are a number of temples such as Manthai mariyamman Koil, Vinayagar Koil, Karuppasamy Koil, Anjeneyar Koil, Muniyappan Koil. There is an elementary school in Athirampatty. There are teaching basic elementary education. Most of officers are from this school.

Villages in Salem district